Diisopropylphosphate is an acetylcholinesterase inhibitor. It acts by covalently binding to acetylcholinesterase.

See also
 Diisopropyl-fluorophosphatase

References

Acetylcholinesterase inhibitors
Organophosphates
Isopropyl esters